Ship's Concert is a 1937 British musical film directed by Leslie S. Hiscott and starring Claude Hulbert, Joyce Kirby and Henry Kendall. It was made as a quota quickie at Teddington Studios by the British subsidiary of Warner Brothers.

Cast
 Claude Hulbert as Claude Stork 
 Joyce Kirby as Joyce  
 Henry Kendall as Harry Bolton  
 Enid Trevor as Enid Stork 
 Jack Donohue as Jack  
 Jack Heller as Dickie  
 Glen Alyn as Plasta Seene  
 Bruce Lester as Purser  
 Reginald Purdell as Reggie  
 George Galleon as Wireless Officer  
 Gibson Gowland as Purser  
 Patricia Burke as Geraldine Jackson  
 Albert le Fre as Privett

References

Bibliography
 Low, Rachael. Filmmaking in 1930s Britain. George Allen & Unwin, 1985.
 Wood, Linda. British Films, 1927-1939. British Film Institute, 1986.

External links

1937 films
British musical films
1937 musical films
1930s English-language films
Films shot at Teddington Studios
Films directed by Leslie S. Hiscott
Quota quickies
British black-and-white films
Warner Bros. films
Films shot in London
1930s British films